Graeme Sims (born 1937) is a dog trainer. Sims developed his system of dog whispering in 1986. During the next ten years he worked as a sheepdog demonstrator at two theme parks in Devon ("The Big Sheep" and "The Milky Way"). He managed The North Devon Sheepdog Breeding and Training Centre for five years. He is the only sheepdog handler to work up to nine dogs simultaneously under testing arena conditions. His work at country fairs  in Britain involved working large groups of Border Collies, each in a different language, in precise movements.

He works in Italy doing seminars on dog training using his system of dog whispering, which Sims believes treats the dog as an intelligent partner rather than as a creature needing domination.

Books published
 The Dog Whisperer: How to Train Your Dog Using Its Own Language, 2009, (Headline), 
 Give a Dog a Home: How to Make Your Rescue Dog a Happy Dog, 2010, (Headline), 
 "L'uomo che sussurra ai cani " (DeAgostini ) 
 "Portami con te" (Sperling & Kupfer) 
 "Una meravigliosa vita da cani" (Sperling & Kupfer)

References

External links
The Graeme Sims Method  
Graeme Sims' Books

1937 births
Living people
Dog trainers
People from North Devon (district)